The London Post Office Railway 1927 Stock was a type of twin-axle electric stock built in 1927 by British manufacturer English Electric. Ninety of these four-wheeled units were built for the London Post Office Railway system, on which they became the first electric stock to be operated on the underground rail system.

History 
Having been built by English Electric throughout 1927 and introduced onto the London Post Office Railways underground network, the 1927 Stock units quickly proved to be overwhelmed by the amount of mail required to be carried on the network.

Along with this, the 1927 Stock proved to not be very reliable as they suffered from mechanical unreliability and high driving wheel wear, this being due to their fixed wheelbase, while also causing heavy track wear themselves as they had problems with the tight curves on the underground lines. Combined with this was their lack of capacity while moving mail through the capital. Due to these problems they were soon replaced by the 1930 Stock units, of which fifty were built. These new units were articulated and solved many of the problems experienced with the 1927 stock. The first batch of these units also reused the wheels, axles and electrical equipment from the 1927 Stock.

A single 1927 Stock unit, 601, has been preserved by the British Postal Museum and Archive and is on display at the museum in London. The unit was retrieved by the museum from the London Post Office Railways Mount Pleasant workshops in 2011 where after it underwent a process of conservation prior to being put on display.

Description 
In service the 1927 Stock units were numbered 591 to 680 and were coupled together to work in 2-car or 3-car trains. They were twin-axle units and used a 4wRE wheel arrangement while being powered by two traction motors which provided the units with a power output of 22 hp (16kW). 

They received their power from a 440 V DC third rail electrification system and traveled on 2 ft (610 mm) gauge track within a custom narrow loading gauge.

Each unit was capable of carrying a single wheeled trolley, in which were housed the mail bags. These trolleys were loaded or unloaded at the various stops along the underground network.

Gallery

References 

 1927